The 1980 Honda Hagibis season was the sixth season of the franchise in the Philippine Basketball Association (PBA). The team was known as Honda Motorbike Makers in the Third Conference.

Transactions
The Hagibis signed a total of five rookies, Oliveros Dalman, Monico Martinez and Roberto Poblete were all teammates at Imperial Textile Mills in the MICAA, along with Frederick Adams and Redentor Vicente.

Summary
Honda were reinforced by Byron "Snake" Jones, who was on his third PBA team after playing for Toyota and U-Tex, and Charles "Buster" Matheney. The Hagibis won their first two games in the Open Conference, spoiling the debut of new team Tefilin, 95–94, in the first game of the season on March 16. Honda scored their second win against Tanduay, 115–97 on March 22. They lost 13 of their remaining 16 games in the elimination phase from thereon.

Honda won their first three outings and raced to a 4-1 won-loss slate in the All-Filipino Conference. The Motorbike Makers lost their last four assignments in the elimination phase and were forced into a playoff against U-Tex for the sixth and last qualifying berth in the round of six. Honda lost to U-Tex in a knockout game on November 13. They dropped all their three matches in the round-robin among the four non-qualifiers in the quarterfinals.

Won-loss record vs Opponents

Roster

References

Honda
Galerie Dominique Artists